Heydar Abbasi, mainly known by his pen name, (Barişmaz : باریشماز), is an Iranian poet, translator, writer and literary critic of Azerbaijani literature.

Early life 
Abbasi was born 1943 in Maragheh, East Azerbaijan. He graduated from the University of Tabriz and later completed his postgraduate studies in Tehran.

Works
The best known work is translate Nahj al-Balagha to Azerbaijani language by Arabic alphabet and Latin, also Masnavi to Azerbaijani language by Arabic alphabet and other works are as follows.
 Nəğmə Daği və Istimar
 Kəbə və qanli azan
 Güləndə hərzaman Məşair və şeytan
 Səs
 Duvarlar
 Ödümlü Dirək
 Çağirilmamiş qonaqlar
 Müxannaslər
 Val- əsr
 Dartilmamiş dənlər

References

External links 
 Meeting to Heydar Abbasi 

1943 births
People from Maragheh
Iranian male writers
20th-century Iranian poets
Azerbaijani-language poets
University of Tabriz alumni
Living people
Iranian translators
21st-century Iranian poets